Sacred Heart Church is a historic church and former Roman Catholic parish church on MLK Drive at Bayview Avenue in the Greenville section of Jersey City, New Jersey, United States. It is within the Archdiocese of Newark.

History and description
Built between 1922 and 1924, it was designed by Boston architect Ralph Adams Cram with a mixture of Spanish Gothic and Moorish architecture. Its stained glass windows were designed by the then 18-year-old Harry Wright Goodhue. 

The complex is listed on the New Jersey Register of Historic Places but is considered threatened.

Sacred Heart Church closed in 2005 when the number of parishioners dropped to a few hundred from the 4,000 it had at its peak. The Archdiocese of Newark has no plans to reopen the church. The affiliated Sacred Heart School remains open. 

The priory of the church become home of the Jersey City Employment & Training Program (JCETP) re-entry program, headed by Jim McGreevey, in 2015.

During the 2019 Jersey City shooting the school was on lock-down and used as defensive position during the incident. That school was taken over by law-enforcement agencies and used during the incident.

See also
Jackson Hill, Jersey City
Bayview – New York Bay Cemetery

References

External links
HPN Network Harry Wright Goodhue

Roman Catholic Archdiocese of Newark
Roman Catholic churches in New Jersey
Neoclassical architecture in New Jersey
Churches in Jersey City, New Jersey
Roman Catholic churches completed in 1924
Ralph Adams Cram church buildings
Former Roman Catholic church buildings
20th-century Roman Catholic church buildings in the United States
Neoclassical church buildings in the United States